Matthias Andreas Baumann (born 5 April 1963 in Munich) is a German equestrian and Olympic champion. He won a team gold medal in eventing at the 1988 Summer Olympics in Seoul.

References

1963 births
Living people
Olympic equestrians of West Germany
Olympic equestrians of Germany
German male equestrians
Equestrians at the 1988 Summer Olympics
Equestrians at the 1992 Summer Olympics
Olympic gold medalists for West Germany
Olympic bronze medalists for Germany
German event riders
Sportspeople from Munich
Olympic medalists in equestrian
Medalists at the 1992 Summer Olympics
Medalists at the 1988 Summer Olympics